In the 2006-07 season Saracens F.C. competed in the Guinness Premiership, EDF Energy Cup and European Challenge Cup.

Transfers
With former coach Mike Ford being offered a role in the England set-up, former Leinster, Munster and Australia coach Alan Gaffney was appointed coach for the 2006 campaign. Amongst the new signings was South African, Neil de Kock, a player who was to be influential in what was to be the club's best season since 2000.

This season also saw the long awaited arrival of former Great Britain Rugby League captain, Andy Farrell, initially at flanker, but later at centre, the position at which he went on to take his England debut.

Squad

Guinness Premiership

As in the previous season, Saracens were narrowly defeated by Wasps in the London double-header at Twickenham at the opening of the season. This was to be followed by what turned out to be a good away draw at Bristol in the context of the excellent season that Bristol would go on to have, before a bonus point win was secured against the Newcastle Falcons. A morale-boosting run of results followed, losing only three times between October and the following March. No individual result could quite produce the reaction that the return of England's Richard Hill to top flight action, with supporters of both clubs giving Hill a huge ovation on his return to the pitch after 18 months of knee reconstruction, capping off his comeback with a try.

Results in the Premiership went Saracens' way, leaving them with the possibility of ending up anywhere from second to fifth as the final round of matches approached. After a day of games almost all of which had significant consequences in terms of positions at the top, and at the foot of the table, Saracens found themselves in the Premiership playoffs for the first time, squeezing Wasps in to a rare 5th place position, out of play-off contention.

The campaign was to end with a heavy defeat away at Gloucester, however, overall the season represented a significant advance on those of recent years. After the end of the season there was to be personal success for Glen Jackson, whose league topping 400 points for the season and consistent high-level performances almost every week saw him awarded the PRA Player of the Year Award by his fellow professionals. On a sadder note the mercurial Thomas Castaignède, one of the most enduringly popular players at the club decided to bring his club rugby career to an end after providing many years of entertainment and rugby at its best both for Saracens and France.

Guinness Premiership Semi-Final: Gloucester Rugby 50 - 9 Saracens

European Challenge Cup

Saracens progressed well in the European Challenge Cup. They qualified for the knockout stages as second seeds, with only an away 6-6 draw at Glasgow spoiling their group stage progression.

A further win at the quarter-final stage against Glasgow saw Saracens host Bath for the semi-final, only to lose to ultimate runners up of the competition.

European Challenge Cup Quarter-Final: Saracens 23 - 19 Glasgow
European Challenge Cup Semi-Final: Saracens 30 - 31 Bath Rugby

EDF Energy Cup

Saracens' EDF Energy Cup campaign ended quickly after back-to-back defeats in the opening two games of the group stages, losing away at London Irish and then at home entertaining Cardiff Blues. Some consolation was found in a 'dead rubber' game at Vicarage Road where Wasps were defeated in a game involving many of the younger squad members of both teams.

Sources
 History of Saracens
 'The Saracen', Matchday programmes 2006-07

External links
 Official site
 Fansite

2006-07
2006–07 English Premiership (rugby union)
2006–07 European Challenge Cup

de:Saracens
fr:Saracens (rugby)
it:Saracens F.C.
ja:サラセンズ
sv:Saracens F.C.